Baywest Homes is a residential home builder with operations in Calgary, Alberta, Canada is a division of Bordeaux Developments. From the company's inception to the present, Baywest has built over 1,000 homes in Calgary and its surrounding communities.

The company was founded in 1985 by Dale Roh and Harry Denger, and partnered with Bordeaux Developments in 2001.

Builder communities 
Baywest Homes has built in the Calgary communities of Tuscany and Sage Hill, Auburn Bay, Mahogany, Rancher's Rise  The Ranches, Riverstone, Westland Estates and Cranston Ridge.

The company has also built homes outside Calgary, including Jumping Pound Ridge in Cochrane and Ki in Springbank.

Corporate awards and recognition 
Baywest Homes has been the recipient of a number of industry-specific awards, including the SAM Awards which recognize creative and professional work in the Calgary home building industry.

The table below summarizes the SAM Awards that Baywest Homes has received since 2000.

Work in the community 
Building Hope for Kids: A Night in Manhattan (2012) - Baywest Homes sponsored this inaugural event in support of the Alberta Children's Hospital Foundation. The event was held in at the Telus Convention Centre and included New York inspired food stations, silent and live auctions as well as live music from Barry Shaw and Unique Soul.

Caring for Kids Radiothon (2012) - Baywest Homes supported this event as a part of Brookfield Residential. Taking in place in February 2012, the event raised over $1.9 million for the Alberta Children's Hospital Foundation.

Inn from the Cold's Polar Bear Plunge (2011) - Held in the community of Mahogany, Baywest Homes participated in this event held by Hopewell Residential Communities to raise money for Inn from the Cold. The event as a whole raised over $50,000 for Inn from the Cold and has since raised more than $100,000 in subsequent years.

Build it Forward (2011) - This initiative, headed by the country music singer Paul Brandt, involves building houses for families in need and having them "build it forward" by participating in other community initiatives. Baywest Homes was a featured builder for the initiative, which was shown on CMT Canada.

References

External links 
 

Companies established in 1985
1985 establishments in Alberta
Companies based in Calgary